Germany 09 (German: Deutschland 09 – 13 kurze Filme zur Lage der Nation) is a German anthology film composed of 13 short films that contemplated the state of Germany at the time. It was conceived as a rejoinder to the 1977 anthology film Germany in Autumn (composed of shorts directed by 11 different filmmakers, including Rainer Werner Fassbinder, Edgar Reitz and Volker Schlöndorff) after 30 years of German history have passed.

Shorts 
According to the film's official website, "Each of the participating directors interprets his personal perception and his own cinematic view of contemporary Germany, abstractly or concretely, freely in the choice of format and content. The individual contributions could be short feature films, documentary films, essayistic or experimental."

References

German anthology films
2000s German-language films
Films directed by Fatih Akin
Films directed by Wolfgang Becker (director, born 1954)
Films directed by Dominik Graf
Films directed by Christoph Hochhäusler
Films directed by Romuald Karmakar
Films directed by Nicolette Krebitz
Films directed by Dani Levy
Films directed by Angela Schanelec
Films directed by Hans Steinbichler
Films directed by Tom Tykwer
Films directed by Hans Weingartner